Spår i snön is the third studio album released by Swedish singer Magnus Carlsson. The album was released in November 2006 and peaked at number 9 on the Swedish charts.

In 2009, the album was re-released as Spår i snön: Special Edition on the Freestar label.

Track listing

2006 CD
Jul igen
Himmel blå
Wrap Myself in Paper
Om jag stannar en stund
En riktig jul för oss (duet with Jessica Andersson)
Känn ingen oro
Faller ner på knä (On My Knees)
Julens tid är här (duet with Molly Sandén)
Wonderful Dreams (Holidays are Coming)
Välkommen hem
Undan vinden (duet with Barbro Svensson)
X-mas medley
Feliz Navidad
Last Christmas
Santa Claus is Coming to Town
Winter Wonderland
Mistletoe and Wine
Ser du stjärnan i det blå (When You Wish upon a Star)

2009 CD 
Jul igen
Himmel blå
Wrap Myself in Paper
Om jag stannar en stund
En riktig jul för oss ( duet with Jessica Andersson)
Känn ingen oro
Faller ner på knä (On My Knees)
Julens tid är här (duet med Molly Sandén)
Wonderful Dreams (Holidays are Coming)
Välkommen hem
Undan vinden (duet med Barbro Svensson)
X-mas medley
Feliz Navidad
Last Christmas
Santa Claus is Coming to Town
Winter Wonderland
Mistletoe and Wine
Ser du stjärnan i det blå
 Bonus Track: O Helga Natt                 
 Bonus Track: On My Knees ("Faller ner på knä", English language version)                  
 Bonus Track: Undan vinden (Magnus solo version)
 Bonus Track: Nu tändas tusen juleljus
 Bonus Track: Ser du stjärnan i det blå ("When You Wish Upon a Star", Swedish language-version)
 Bonus Track: Faller ner på knä (Soft version)

Charts

Weekly charts

Year-end charts

Release history

References

2006 albums
Magnus Carlsson albums
2006 Christmas albums
Christmas albums by Swedish artists